Jolene Nancy Anderson (born July 22, 1986) is an American basketball player who was drafted by the Connecticut Sun in the 2008 WNBA Draft. She currently plays for Barca CBS in Liga Feminina 2. With 2,312 total points she is the all-time leading scorer for University of Wisconsin women's basketball team.

Personal life
Anderson studied sociology at the University of Wisconsin.

Wisconsin  statistics

Source

References 

1986 births
Living people
American expatriate basketball people in Italy
American women's basketball players
Basketball players from Wisconsin
Connecticut Sun draft picks
Connecticut Sun players
People from Superior, Wisconsin
Shooting guards
Wisconsin Badgers women's basketball players